Jiang Fenfen (born 19 September 1997) is a Chinese Paralympic athlete who competes in sprinting events in international level events. She is a Paralympic gold medalist and three-time medalist at the World Para Athletics Championships.

Career
Jiang was born in 1997 and she was brought up in Hunan Province. Her uncle was a PE teacher and he encouraged her to get involved with sport in 2014. She was recruited as China looked for para-athletes and in 2016 she competed at her first international event.

Jiang represented China at the 2016 Summer Paralympics; in the women's 4 × 100 metres relay T35-T38 event she won the gold medal together with Wen Xiaoyan, Chen Junfei and Li Yingli. She won three medals at the 2019 World Para Athletics Championships, having won the silver medal in the women's 100 metres and the bronze medal in the women's 200 metres and women's 400 metres.

References

1997 births
Living people
People from Yongzhou
Paralympic athletes of China
Chinese female sprinters
Paralympic gold medalists for China
Paralympic silver medalists for China
Paralympic bronze medalists for China
Athletes (track and field) at the 2016 Summer Paralympics
Athletes (track and field) at the 2020 Summer Paralympics
Medalists at the 2016 Summer Paralympics
Medalists at the 2020 Summer Paralympics
Medalists at the World Para Athletics Championships
21st-century Chinese women